Triac, by Green Vehicles Inc., was a two-seat three-wheeled concept car unveiled in 2010–2011.  The company went out of business in 2011.

The Triac freeway commuter Early Adopter program closed as of June 15, 2010.  The company announced in July 2011 that they will be shutting down all operations.
Previously they had been accepting pre-orders for the Triac2.0 requiring a $500 reservation fee and an anticipated delivery in 2011.

Green Vehicles was originally based in San Jose, California, but the company relocated to an  facility in Salinas, California.

Charging the TRIAC's 144 volt, 160 amp-hour batteries takes approximately 5 hours when the vehicle is plugged into either 120 or 240 volts AC. Triac was designed with a steel safety cage construction with the two front tires controlling steering and front wheel drive.

See also
 Elio Motors
 Aptera Motors
 Hypercar
 Loremo

References

External links 
Official Green Vehicles Site
TRIAC Specs

Electric concept cars
Three-wheeled motor vehicles
Plug-in hybrid vehicles